In enzymology, an aspartate—ammonia ligase (ADP-forming) is an enzyme that catalyzes the chemical reaction

ATP + L-aspartate + NH3  ADP + phosphate + L-asparagine

The 3 substrates of this enzyme are ATP, L-aspartate, and NH3, whereas its 3 products are ADP, phosphate, and L-asparagine.

This enzyme belongs to the family of ligases, specifically those forming carbon-nitrogen bonds as acid-D-ammonia (or amine) ligases (amide synthases).  The systematic name of this enzyme class is L-aspartate:ammonia ligase (ADP-forming). Other names in common use include asparagine synthetase (ADP-forming), and asparagine synthetase (adenosine diphosphate-forming).  This enzyme participates in nitrogen metabolism.

References 

 

EC 6.3.1
Enzymes of unknown structure